María José Uribe Durán (known more commonly as Mariajo Uribe; born 27 February 1990) is a professional golfer from Colombia, currently playing on the LPGA Tour.

Amateur career 
Uribe was born in Girón, Santander. At age 17, she won the 2007 U.S. Women's Amateur, defeating Amanda Blumenherst 1 up. She is the only player from Latin America to have won this championship. Uribe tied for tenth and low amateur at the 2008 U.S. Women's Open and won the 2008 Mexican International Amateur. She played college golf at UCLA, and was an All-American First Team selection in 2008 and 2009.

Professional career 
Uribe left UCLA in the spring of 2009 to return to her native Colombia. Prior to the 2009 U.S. Women's Open, Uribe ended her amateur status and competed in the tournament as a professional.

Uribe joined the Duramed Futures Tour in July 2009 and competed in the ING New England Golf Classic, finishing in a tie for 15th place. At the end of the year she qualified for both LPGA and LET membership for 2010 on her first attempt.

On 29 May 2011, Uribe won the HSBC Brazil Cup, an unofficial LPGA event, defeating Lindsey Wright by one stroke.

Uribe won the gold medal at the 2015 Pan American Games and the silver medal at the 2014 South American Games.

Amateur wins 
2007 U.S. Women's Amateur
2008 Mexican International Amateur

Professional wins (1) 
2011 HSBC Brazil Cup (unofficial LPGA Tour event)

Results in LPGA majors 
Results not in chronological order before 2019.

LA = Low amateur
CUT = missed the half-way cut
"T" = tied

Summary

Most consecutive cuts made – 7 (twice)
Longest streak of top-10s – 1 (twice)

LPGA Tour career summary 

1 Uribe played the first of her three events in 2009 as an amateur.
 official through the 2022 season

Team appearances
Amateur
Espirito Santo Trophy (representing Colombia): 2006, 2008

References

External links 

Profile on the Colombian Golf Federation's official site (archived)
Mariajo Uribe Rookie Blog

Colombian female golfers
LPGA Tour golfers
Ladies European Tour golfers
Winners of ladies' major amateur golf championships
Olympic golfers of Colombia
Golfers at the 2016 Summer Olympics
Golfers at the 2020 Summer Olympics
UCLA Bruins women's golfers
Golfers at the 2015 Pan American Games
Pan American Games medalists in golf
Pan American Games gold medalists for Colombia
Medalists at the 2015 Pan American Games
South American Games silver medalists for Colombia
South American Games medalists in golf
Competitors at the 2014 South American Games
Sportspeople from Santander Department
1990 births
Living people
20th-century Colombian women
21st-century Colombian women